"The Missing Page" is an episode from the comedy series Hancock's Half Hour, starring British comedian Tony Hancock and also featuring regular co-star Sid James. First transmitted on 11 March 1960, the show was written by Ray Galton and Alan Simpson, and was produced by Duncan Wood.

Synopsis 

Anthony Hancock has taken up reading and claims to be familiar with the works of Bertrand Russell, although in reality his preferred reading matter is crime fiction.

He borrows a book from the library, the murder mystery Lady, Don't Fall Backwards by Darcy Sarto, and back at 23 Railway Cuttings proceeds to provide Sid with a running commentary on the plot whilst reading it. Sid is impatient to know the identity of the killer, but Hancock assures him this is always revealed on the last page. However, when Hancock reaches the end, where the detective Johnny Oxford is about to reveal the killer's identity, he finds the last page has been torn out. Hancock is initially dismayed, but then insists that it should be possible for Sid and himself to work out the identity of the killer using the clues provided by the author. However, their attempts at deduction prove fruitless.

Returning the book to the library — and angrily denying the librarian's suggestion that Hancock himself is the vandal — Hancock and Sid find out the address of the last reader to borrow the book nine years previously, a Mr. Proctor, hoping that he will know the answer. However, it transpires that the page was already missing from the book when Proctor read it, and Proctor becomes agitated on being reminded of the unsolved mystery. When Hancock and Sid decide to try the previous reader — i.e. the one who borrowed the book before Proctor — and the publishers, Proctor tells them he has already tried both: the reader got fed up with the book halfway through and didn't finish it; and when he went to the publishers six years ago, he found the book was out of print and all the unsold copies have been pulped.

Still undeterred, Hancock and Sid visit the author's house, only to find an LCC plaque on the wall saying that Darcy Sarto died in 1949. Finally, the pair visit the British Museum, reasoning that they must have a copy since every book published in the United Kingdom is stored there. Sure enough, a complete copy of Lady, Don't Fall Backwards is found at the museum. However, instead of the ending, Hancock and Sid find on the last page a publisher's note saying Sarto died before completing the story, and the unfinished book was published to allow Johnny Oxford fans worldwide to read what there was of Sarto's last work. Disgusted, Hancock declares he will never read a book again and will instead take up a new hobby — the gramophone.

Later, back home, Hancock has purchased his audio equipment and Sid returns from having purchased some records. However, Hancock is unamused by Sid's choice of music, which is "Schubert's Unfinished Symphony". He breaks the record over Sid's head and walks off.

Cast 
 Tony Hancock	...	Anthony Aloysius Hancock
 Sidney James	...	Sidney Balmoral James (as Sid James)
 Hugh Lloyd ... Librarian
 George Coulouris ... Mr. Proctor
 Gordon Phillott ... British Museum assistant librarian (as Gordon Philpott)
 Totti Truman Taylor ... Woman in library
 Gibb  McLaughlin ... Old man in library
 Kenneth Kove ... Old man in library
 Peggy Ann Clifford ... Woman in library (as Peggyann Clifford)
 Alec Bregonzi ... Man in library
 James Bulloch ... Man in library
 Johnny Vyvyan ... Man in library (as John Vyvyan)

Decca re-recording

In 1965 Decca Records produced an audio remake of "The Missing Page", together with a remake of "The Reunion Party" from the same series. These were produced in the style of the radio shows, complete with an invited studio audience, and released as an LP in 1965.  These recordings marked the last time that Tony Hancock and Sid James worked together.

Paul Merton remake 

A remake starring Paul Merton in the Hancock role was broadcast on ITV on 23 February 1996 as part of the series Paul Merton in Galton & Simpson's...

In popular culture

Echo and the Bunnymen wrote and recorded a song entitled "Lady Don't Fall Backwards" as the B-side to their 1990 single "Enlighten Me".

Pete Doherty wrote the song "Lady, Don't Fall Backwards" and performed it for the BBC documentary The Unknown Hancock, screened in 2005. The song appears on his album Grace/Wastelands.

The quarterly magazine of the Tony Hancock Appreciation Society is called The Missing Page.

A full-length novel entitled Lady, Don't Fall Backwards incorporating and expanding on the material in the television dialogue was published in 2013. Though credited to Darcy Sarto and with a cover closely resembling that which was shown on-screen, it was written by Alex Skerratt with the permission of Galton, Simpson and the BBC.

References

External links
 

1960 British television episodes
BBC television comedy